Aswagen (also spelled Arsvaghen and Aswahen) was the eight Arsacid king of Caucasian Albania, ruling from approximately 415 to 440. He was most likely the son of the previous Albanian king Urnayr, while his mother was a daughter of the Sasanian King of Kings (shahanshah) of Iran, Shapur II. Aswagen was himself married to a daughter of shahanshah Yazdegerd II.

Aswagen is mentioned in a Middle Persian seal, whose inscription reads: Āhzwahēn i, Ārān šāh ("Āhzwahēn, King of Aran (Albania)"). The seal is one of the three known unique aristocratic Albanian gem-seals that were crafted between the end of the 4th-century and the start of the 6th-century. Furthermore, it is also important for the cultural and political connections between Sasanian Iran and Albania, as well as the role of Middle Persian in Albania. The seal depicts a "Moon chariot" monogram, which may have been his royal emblem, and also possibly used by the rest of the Arsacid kings of Albania. An identical symbol is depicted on Sasanian gems, as well as Kushan-Sasanian, Chionite, Alkhan, Nezak and Hephthalite coins. The Dagestani historian Murtazali Gadjiev suggests that the monogram was a symbol of their blood ties with the Sasanians, and therefore lineage from the gods.

Aswagen was succeeded by Vache II, who was most likely his son. The later Albanian king Vachagan III may have also been Aswagen's son.

References

Sources 
 
 
 

5th-century rulers in Europe
Arsacid kings of Caucasian Albania
5th-century Iranian people
Vassal rulers of the Sasanian Empire